Cyprine may refer to:

 a variety of the mineral vesuvianite
 a valid mineral species (see cyprine (mineral), IMA2015-044) from the vesuvianite group 
 the Icelandic cyprine, an ocean quahog
 a type of vaginal lubrication
 a character in Sailor Moon

See also: Cyprinid